is a Japanese singer and actress who worked from the late 1960s to the early 1990s.

Chiaki made her debut as a singer in 1969, and released her breakthrough single "Yottsu no Onegai" in the following year. "Kassai", a song which has been commonly considered her signature song was released in 1972 and gained success, and finally won the 14th Japan Record Award. "Kassai" sold over one million copies by February 1973, and was awarded a gold disc.
 
After marrying the actor Eiji Go in 1978, Chiaki continued her career intermittently until circa 1992. However, she has disappeared from the Japanese entertainment scene for over 16 years, after her spouse died of lung cancer.

Discography

Studio albums 
  (1970)
  (1970)
  (1970)
  (1972)
  (1972)
  (1974)
  (1974)
  (1975)
  (1975)
  (1976)
  (1976)
  (1977)
  (1978)
  (1981)
 Three Hundreds Club (1982)
  (1983)
  (aka ) (1985)
  (1988)
  (1989)
  (1989)
  (1989)
  (1990)
  (1991)
  (1991)

Singles

Kōhaku Uta Gassen Appearances

References 

1947 births
Japanese women singers
Japanese actresses
Living people
Nippon Columbia artists
Singers from Tokyo